Firuzkuh (also Romanized as Fīrūzkūh and Fīrūz Kūh; Tabarian: Pirezcow; also known as Qaşabeh-ye Fīrūz Kūh) is a city in the Central District of Firuzkuh County, Tehran province, Iran, and serves as capital of the county. At the 2006 census, its population was 15,807 in 4,334 households. The following census in 2011 counted 20,371 people in 5,484 households. The latest census in 2016 showed a population of 17,453 people in 5,700 households.

It is located northeast of Tehran, in the middle of Alborz Mountains. Previously, it was part of Mazandaran Province.

The city has a relatively cool and windy climate. It has some natural attractions and is famous for them, including Tange Vashi, Boornic Cave, Roodafshan Cave, Village Gadook, and the sight-seeing of villages like Varse-Kharan, Zarrin Dasht, Darreh-Deh, and Kaveh Deh.

Firuzkuh is rich in historical heritage and some of the most ancient objects in Tehran Province have been found there. Among its villages, Darreh-Deh contains the most ancient places. During the reign of Timur, Ruy González de Clavijo praised the town's concentric citadel and suggested that it could resist any assault. Nearby castles belonged to the Nizari Ismaili state. Veresk Bridge lies on the road north of Firuzkuh.

Climate
Firuzkuh has a cold semi-arid climate (Köppen BSk).

References 

Firuzkuh County

Cities in Tehran Province

Populated places in Tehran Province

Populated places in Firuzkuh County